Aukštoji Freda Manor (English: The High Freda Manor) is a former residential manor in Freda, Kaunas.

Gallery

References

Manor houses in Lithuania
Classicism architecture in Lithuania